Scott Stewart may refer to:

 Scott Stewart (baseball) (born 1975), pitcher in Major League Baseball
 Scott Stewart (director), American film director, writer, producer and visual effects developer
 Scott Stewart (footballer) (born 1996), Scottish footballer
 Scott Stewart (politician), Australian politician
 Scott Stewart (rugby union) (born 1969), Canadian rugby player